Snead is a town in Blount County, Alabama, United States. At the 2020 census, the population was 1,032.

History
First settled in 1839, what is now Snead began to expand in the 1850s when local businessman G.W. White built a gristmill on the nearby Black Warrior River.  The town is named for John Snead, who became its first postmaster in 1882 (Snead State Community College in nearby Boaz is also named for John Snead).  The Town of Snead incorporated in 1966.

Geography
Snead is located in northeastern Blount County at 34°6'57.492" North, 86°23'29.443" West (34.115970, -86.391512). The town is centered on the crossroads of U.S. Route 278 and Alabama State Route 75. US-278 leads east  to Gadsden and west  to Cullman.

The town is bordered to the northeast by the Locust Fork of the Black Warrior River.

Demographics

2020 census

As of the 2020 United States census, there were 1,032 people, 382 households, and 251 families residing in the town.

2010 census
As of the census of 2010, there were 835 people, 374 households, and 233 families residing in the town. The racial makeup of the town was 96.8% White, 0.1% Asian, 0.1% African American (U.S. Census), 0.5% Native American (U.S. Census), 0.8% from some other race, and 1.7% from two or more races. 1.8% of the population were Hispanic or Latino of any race.

There were 374 households, out of which 25.1% had children under the age of 18 living with them, 51.9% were married couples living together, 8.0% had a female householder with no husband present, and 37.7% were non-families. 35.8% of all households were made up of individuals, and 19.8% had someone living alone who was 65 years of age or older. The average household size was 2.23 and the average family size was 2.9.

In the town, the age distribution of the population shows 22.6% under the age of 18, 5.9% from 18 to 24, 23.0% from 25 to 44, 25.9% from 45 to 64, and 22.6% who were 65 years of age or older. The median age was 43.8 years. For every 100 females, there were 85.1 males. For every 100 females age 18 and over, there were 82.4 males.

The median income for a household in the town was $36,029, and the median income for a family was $41,563. Males had a median income of $23,558 versus $13,799 for females. The per capita income for the town was $15,891. About 9.8% of families and 15.0% of the population were below the poverty line, including 15.8% of those under age 18 and 20.2% of those age 65 or over.

References

External links

Towns in Blount County, Alabama
Towns in Alabama
Birmingham metropolitan area, Alabama